Flakpanzer is a German term for "anti-aircraft tanks" ("flak" is derived from Flugabwehrkanone, literally "aircraft defence cannon"; "panzer" is derived from Panzerkampfwagen, literally "armored fighting vehicle"). These vehicles are modified tanks whose armament was intended to engage aircraft, rather than targets on the ground.

Several vehicles with this name were used by the German Army during World War II. After the war, others were used by both the West German Bundeswehr and the East German National People's Army.

World War II
 Flakpanzer I, a converted version of the Panzer I tank.
 Flakpanzer 38(t), based on the Panzer 38(t) light tank
 Flakpanzer IV, the general designation for a series of vehicles based on the Panzerkampfwagen IV medium tank chassis, including the:
 Möbelwagen
 Wirbelwind
 Ostwind
 Kugelblitz, in prototype stage at the end of World War II
 Flakpanzer Coelian, a prototype that reached the wooden mockup stage.
 Flakpanzer Mareșal, proposal

Post war
 M42 Duster, an American vehicle used by the Bundeswehr and designated the Flakpanzer M42
 Flakpanzer Gepard, used by the Bundeswehr
 ZSU-57-2, used by the National People's Army of East Germany
 ZSU-23-4, used by the National People's Army of East Germany

See also 
 Self-propelled anti-aircraft weapon

References

World War II self-propelled anti-aircraft weapons of Germany
Self-propelled anti-aircraft weapons